Anthony Brown (1 April 1945 – 22 September 2022) was an English professional darts player. He came close to winning the world championship on a number of occasions, reaching the World Professional Darts Championships semi-finals four times, losing twice to Eric Bristow and twice to John Lowe.

Career

Brown appeared in the first-ever World Championship in 1978 as the number 8 seed, but surprisingly lost to Australian namesake Tim Brown. Brown then went on to reach the semi-finals of the World Championship for three successive years - 1979, 1980 and 1981. After a surprise second-round defeat in the 1982 Championships, Brown reached the semi-final again in 1983, losing to Bristow.

He also enjoyed success in other major tournaments, winning the televised British Open in 1979 and Yorkshire Television's Indoor League darts competition in 1977. He won the first two Darts World KO Cup tournaments held in Oldham – these were subsequently sponsored by Dry Blackthorn Cider from 1983 to 1989. He defeated Nicky Virachkul in the 1980 final. He also won the WDF Europe Cup Singles event in 1980. Brown reached the final of the prestigious Winmau World Masters in 1978, losing out to Welshman Ronnie Davies.

Brown enjoyed team success with England – winning the WDF World Cup team event in 1979 and 1981 and the WDF World Cup pairs with Cliff Lazarenko in 1981. He also teamed up with Lowe and Bristow to enjoy Nations Cup triples success for England in 1979 and 1980. 

Brown was one of the players who helped form the players' association PDPA (Professional Dart Players Association) along with Lowe, Lazarenko and Dave Whitcombe. The association was set up with the intention of promoting more televised tournaments. Although Brown was not part of the darts scene in the 1990s (his last World Championship appearance was at the 1984 BDO World Darts Championship), the PDPA would be instrumental in the formation of the World Darts Council (now Professional Darts Corporation) and would split the game into two organisations.

Brown moved back to his home town of Dover, and was back playing in the local league, the Dover Invitation Darts League.

World Championship results

BDO
 1978: First round (lost to Tim Brown 3–6) (legs) 
 1979: Semi-final (lost to John Lowe 2–3); Third place: (beat Alan Evans 2–1) (sets) 
 1980: Semi-final (lost to Eric Bristow 3–4); Third place: (beat Cliff Lazarenko 2–0)
 1981: Semi-final (lost to John Lowe 1–4); Fourth place: (lost to Cliff Lazarenko 1–2)
 1982: Second round (lost to Dave Miller 0–2)
 1983: Semi-final (lost to Eric Bristow 1–5); Fourth place: (lost to Jocky Wilson 0–2)
 1984: First round (lost to John Lowe 0–2)

Career Finals

BDO major finals: 1 (1 runner-up)

Performance timeline

References

External links
Profile and stats on Darts Database

1945 births
2022 deaths
English darts players
Living people
Sportspeople from Dover, Kent
British Darts Organisation players